Antheuil is a commune in the Côte-d'Or department in the Bourgogne-Franche-Comté region of eastern France.

Geography
Antheuil is located some 40 km south-west of Dijon and 25 km north-west of Beaune. It can be accessed by the minor D115 road running north from the D18 road passing through the village and continuing north-west to join the D33. The commune is hilly and heavily forested.

The Antheuil river rises south of the village and flows north-west to join the Ouche near Veuvey-sur-Ouche.

Neighbouring communes and villages

Heraldry

Administration

List of Successive Mayors

Demography
In 2017 the commune had 60 inhabitants.

Sites and monuments

Le Bel Affeux, a picturesque stream
La Roche percée (Pierced rock), a hill in the east
La Roche des Demoiselles (Young ladies' rock), a hill in the west
La Roche plate (Flat rock)
The Château Mignon
The Parish Church of Saint-Antide contains two items t5hat are registered as historical objects:
A Statue: Virgin and child (16th century)
A Stoup (12th century)

See also
Communes of the Côte-d'Or department

References

External links
Canton of Bligny sur Ouche official website 
Antheuil on the National Geographic Institute website 
Antheuil on Géoportail, National Geographic Institute (IGN) website 
Antheuil on the 1750 Cassini Map

Communes of Côte-d'Or